Nie Fengzhi (7 September 1913 – 3 April 1992) was a general of the People's Liberation Army Air Force (PLAAF) of the People's Republic of China.

Biography
Nie was born in Dawu County, Hubei in 1913 or 1914. He belonged to the dominant Han ethnic group.

Nie served in the People's Liberation Army (PLA) from 1929 until his retirement. He was involved in founding the PLAAF, and commanded the PLA's first aerial unit, the 4th Mixed Aviation Brigade, which was established on 19 June 1950 in Nanjing and consisted of 155 aircraft in one attack, one bomber, and two fighter regiments. He attained the rank of lieutenant general in 1955.

Korean War
In 1951, following China's entry into the Korean War, Nie commanded the East China Military Region Air Force and the People's Volunteer Army's short-lived Bomber Command at Dongfeng in Jilin province. After Liu Zhen returned to China in July 1952, Nie commanded the PLAAF in Korea.

Taiwan Strait Crises
At the time of the First Taiwan Strait Crisis, Nie commanded the East China (Huadong) Air Force. During the Crisis, he served as vice-commander of the Zhejiang Front Command (ZFC)—established in 1954 by order of Mao Zedong and led by Zhang Aiping—and commanded the ZFC air force. He was one of the architects of the campaign to capture the Dachen Islands from the Republic of China. During a meeting of the ZFC commanders on 31 August 1954, Nie opposed the "majority opinion" favoring an immediate amphibious invasion of Dachen, and instead supported the "limited piecemeal tactics" proposed by Zhang. The resulting "Zhang-Nie plan" involved a focus on Yijiangshan Island, north of Dachen, and led to the Battle of Yijiangshan Islands in January 1955. During the course of the campaign, Nie personally spoke with every PLA pilot participating in operations in order to convey the order issued by the Central Military Commission to avoid direct confrontation with American air forces.

During the Second Taiwan Strait Crisis in 1958, Nie served as commander of the Fujian Front Command air force.

Nanjing Military Region
From 1975 to 1977, Nie served as Deputy Commander of the PLA's Nanjing Military Region and was a member of the Standing Committee of the Party Committee of the Nanjing Military Region CPC. He became the Commander of the military region and Secretary of the Standing Committee in 1977, and remained in these posts until 1982. He was also a member of the 11th Central Committee of the Communist Party of China, which was in session from 1977 to 1982.

Death
Nie died in 1992.

Selected publications

References

Citations

Works cited
 
 
 
 
 

1910s births
1992 deaths
Chinese military personnel of the Korean War
Commanders of the Nanjing Military Region
Deputy commanders of the Nanjing Military Region
Members of the 11th Central Committee of the Chinese Communist Party
People's Liberation Army Air Force generals
People's Liberation Army generals from Hubei